As Long as You've Got Your Health is a 1966 French comedy film directed by and starring Pierre Étaix. It consists of four separate stories: a man reads about vampires all night, people leave their workplaces and try to find a seat in a cinema, people suffer from stress and consult a psychiatrist who is the most stressed of them all, and a group of people visit a small forest for different reasons.

Cast
 Pierre Étaix as Pierre
 Denise Péronne
 Sabine Sun
 Claude Massot
 Véra Valmont
 Émile Coryn
 Roger Trapp
 Alain Janey

Release
The film was released in France on 25 February 1966. It competed at the 1966 San Sebastián International Film Festival where it won the Silver Seashell. In 2013 it was released on home media by The Criterion Collection together with four other Étaix films.

References

1966 comedy films
1966 films
Films directed by Pierre Étaix
French anthology films
French comedy films
1960s French-language films
1960s French films